The stripe-throated jery (Neomixis striatigula) is a species of bird in the family Cisticolidae.
It is endemic to Madagascar.

Its natural habitats are subtropical or tropical dry forest and subtropical or tropical moist lowland forest.

References

stripe-throated jery
stripe-throated jery
Taxonomy articles created by Polbot